Hartlaub's babbler (Turdoides hartlaubii) or the Angola babbler, is a species of bird in the family Leiothrichidae, which is native to south central Africa. The common name and Latin binomial commemorate the German physician and ornithologist  Gustav Hartlaub.

Range
The species is found in Angola, Botswana, Burundi, DRC, Namibia, Rwanda, Tanzania, Zambia, and Zimbabwe.

Gallery

References

Collar, N. J. & Robson, C. 2007. Family Timaliidae (Babblers)  pp. 70 – 291 in; del Hoyo, J., Elliott, A. & Christie, D.A. eds. Handbook of the Birds of the World, Vol. 12. Picathartes to Tits and Chickadees. Lynx Edicions, Barcelona.

External links
 Hartlaub's babbler - Species text in The Atlas of Southern African Birds.

Hartlaub's babbler
Birds of Sub-Saharan Africa
Birds of Southern Africa
Hartlaub's babbler
Taxonomy articles created by Polbot